Fredric Scott Satterfield (born December 21, 1972) is an American college football coach and former player. He is the head football coach at the University of Cincinnati, a position he has held since the 2023 season. Satterfield served as the head football coach at  Appalachian State University from 2013 to 2018 and the University of Louisville from 2019 to 2022.

Playing career
Satterfield played quarterback for Orange High School, located in Hillsborough, North Carolina, from 1989 to 1991. He attended Appalachian State from 1991 to 1996 and started 27 games at quarterback from 1992–95 under Coach Jerry Moore. As a senior in 1995, Satterfield led the Mountaineers to an undefeated regular season and the quarter final of the NCAA Division I-AA playoffs, where they lost to Stephen F. Austin State University. He earned first-team all-conference honors as a senior.

Satterfield graduated from Appalachian State in 1996 with a degree in physical education.

Coaching career

Assistant coaching career
He joined the Appalachian staff as receivers coach in 1998 before mentoring running backs (1999–2002) and quarterbacks (2002–2008), serving an important role in the university's transition from power-I to spread-formation offense. He was primary signal-caller from 2004 to 2009, directing a team that consistently ranked in the top ten in five different NCAA I-AA categories: scoring, rushing, passing, passing efficiency and total offense. He spent one year at the University of Toledo as quarterbacks coach and passing game coordinator and a two-year stint at Florida International University as offensive coordinator before returning to his alma mater in a similar role in 2012.

Appalachian State
After head coach Jerry Moore was not retained following the 2012 season, Satterfield was promoted to head coach. Satterfield led the Mountaineers through one of the most successful FCS to FBS transitions leading them to three Sun Belt Conference championships and four years of bowl game eligibility with 3/4 wins accredited to him. Satterfield resigned prior to the 2018 New Orleans Bowl to become the head coach at The University of Louisville for the 2019 football season.

Louisville
Satterfield had a successful first season at Louisville, with his 2019 team going 8–5 overall and winning the 2019 Music City Bowl over Mississippi State, earning him the ACC Coach of the Year Award.

The next three seasons were more of a mixed result, going 4–7 in 2020 and 6–7 with a bowl loss in 2021. In what would be his last season in Louisville, the 2022 Cardinals began the year 2–3 before turning around the season, briefly being ranked No. 25, and finishing with a 7–5 regular season record. 

Satterfield would leave Louisville for Cincinnati with a 25–24 overall record and having lead the team to 3 bowl appearances.

Cincinnati
On December 5, 2022 Satterfield was named the head coach of Cincinnati.

Head coaching record

*resigned prior to bowl game

*resigned prior to bowl game

Personal life
Satterfield is a Christian. He is married to Beth Satterfield. They have one daughter and two sons.

Notes

References

External links
 Cincinnati profile

1972 births
Living people
American football quarterbacks
Appalachian State Mountaineers football coaches
Appalachian State Mountaineers football players
Cincinnati Bearcats football coaches
FIU Panthers football coaches
Louisville Cardinals football coaches
Toledo Rockets football coaches
People from Hillsborough, North Carolina
Coaches of American football from North Carolina
Players of American football from North Carolina